Interstate 43 (I-43) is a  Interstate Highway located entirely within the US state of Wisconsin, connecting I-39/I-90 in Beloit with Milwaukee and I-41, U.S. Highway 41 (US 41) and US 141 in Green Bay. State Trunk Highway 32 (WIS 32) runs concurrently with I-43 in two sections and I-94, I-894, US 10, US 41, US 45, and WIS 57 overlap I-43 once each. There are no auxiliary or business routes connected to I-43, though an alternate route to direct traffic during road closures is signed along local and state highways from Milwaukee County north into Brown County.

I-43 came about as a result of toll road proposals that included a Milwaukee to Superior corridor that included Hurley, Wausau, and Green Bay. Only the Milwaukee-to-Green Bay section was approved. The route was originally planned to follow an alignment about midway between US 41 and US 141 (the latter paralleled Lake Michigan at the time) along WIS 57. Controversy about this location and use of right-of-way led to the establishment of the current alignment, which follows much of what was the 1950s-era realignment of US 141 from Milwaukee to Sheboygan, and a new alignment from Sheboygan to Green Bay. This section was completed in 1981.

The Beloit-to-Milwaukee segment was developed after two separate proposals for Interstates, one of them between Milwaukee and Beloit and the other between Milwaukee and Janesville. The Milwaukee–Beloit route was chosen, completed in 1976 as WIS 15 and renumbered as I-43 in 1988. To connect the two segments, I-43 was signed concurrently with the east–west segment of I-894 and the north–south portion of I-94 in the greater Milwaukee metropolitan area from I-894 to the Marquette Interchange, which was completely reconstructed with work being completed in 2008.

Route description

I-43 begins in Rock County as the eastern leg of a T interchange with I-39/I-90 just east of Beloit. The highway becomes WIS 81 west of the interchange. The Beloit-to-Milwaukee segment of I-43 passes mainly through farmland situated on rolling hills, going around urbanized areas except for in the greater Milwaukee area, where the route passes through suburban residential areas with some embedded industrial establishments. , daily traffic counts for Rock County range from 12,400 to 19,200 with the higher counts closest to Beloit. The interchange with I-39/I-90 accommodates 1,000–5,200 vehicles daily, with the most traffic on ramps connecting southbound I-39/I-90 to westbound WIS 81 and westbound I-43 to southbound I-39/I-90. I-43 passes north of Darien and crosses US 14 at that point, then junctions with WIS 50 south of Delavan. , about 14,000–19,200 vehicles use this section daily.

In Elkhorn, I-43 junctions with WIS 67, US 12, and WIS 11. It then enters Waukesha County at Mukwonago. I-43 crosses WIS 83 at an interchange just southeast of the village. It then turns east to enter Milwaukee County. , traffic volumes range from 21,000 around Elkhorn to 35,800 in Waukesha County to 85,000 (2007 figures) at WIS 100.

The Beloit-to-Milwaukee portion (at the Hale Interchange with I-894) was given the name "Rock Freeway" because the freeway traverses Rock County and heads towards the cities in the Rock River valley, including Rockford, Illinois. However, the moniker generally only applies to the portion of the route in Waukesha and Milwaukee counties; freeway names in southeastern Wisconsin media are used interchangeably with Interstate numbers. The freeway is entirely four lanes from Beloit to New Berlin. A six-lane segment begins where US 45 merges on the Interstate.

I-43 connects with US 45 south and WIS 100 at South 108th Street. At the Mitchell Interchange, I-894 ends and I-41/I-94/US 41 continues south while I-43 turns north to follow I-94 northbound, also known as the North–South Freeway, into downtown Milwaukee, where it meets I-794 at the Marquette Interchange. , the Airport Freeway carries 107,000–134,000 vehicles per day. The freeway between the Mitchell and Marquette interchanges carried less at that time—97,000 (closer to downtown) to 105,000. The highway passes through mixed urban residential and industrial areas of the greater Milwaukee area, carrying six lanes throughout with the exception of near the Marquette Interchange where eight lanes of traffic exist.

I-43 continues north from the Marquette Interchange, while I-94 turns westward. After passing through downtown Milwaukee, just east of Marquette University, it crosses US 18 at Highland Boulevard and crosses WIS 145 at the McKinley Boulevard/Fond du Lac Avenue interchange. Exit 72C's northbound off- and on-ramps in downtown Milwaukee pass underneath the county courthouse via tunnels to Kilbourn Avenue. On the way north out of Milwaukee, the Interstate passes through Glendale, junctioning with WIS 190 (Capitol Drive) and WIS 57 (Green Bay Avenue), and north of Good Hope Road has a grassy median with a cable barrier. WIS 100 and WIS 32 connect at Brown Deer Road and WIS 32 follows the Interstate north into Ozaukee County. Up to 146,000 vehicles used this portion daily in 2007. This count decreased further north, with a count of 78,900 vehicles per day near WIS 100's northern terminus and 69,600 closer to the Ozaukee County border. As it passes through mixed residential and commercial zones north of downtown, the highway carries eight lanes of traffic downtown, six lanes of traffic north of North Avenue to Bender Road, and four lanes of traffic north of Bender road all the way to Green Bay.

The urban residential areas thin out north of this point as a mix of farmland and forest begins to dominate. WIS 33 crosses the route in Saukville. WIS 57 turns north off the freeway, which turns eastward to go around Port Washington to the north. WIS 32 rejoins the freeway on the northside and the two routes follow the Lake Michigan shoreline northeast into Sheboygan County. WIS 32 leaves the freeway at Cedar Grove and the Interstate passes Oostburg to the east and Sheboygan to the west. In Sheboygan, I-43 intersects WIS 28, WIS 23, and WIS 42. , traffic counts in southern Ozaukee County peak at 66,900 vehicles per day—this value generally decreases further north. , the counts in Sheboygan County bottom out at 21,100 vehicles per day just south of the Manitowoc County line.

I-43 passes Cleveland on the county line. The highway continues to follow the lakeshore to straddle Manitowoc's westside, passing west of Newton, Wisconsin, with a weigh station for southbound truck drivers located midway between Newton and Cleveland. I-43 connects with US 151 and WIS 42. WIS 42 north follows the freeway north to the interchange with US 10. WIS 42 leaves to the east along with US 10 east, and US 10 west follows I-43 north to the interchange with WIS 310 where it turns off to the west. The Interstate passes Francis Creek and Maribel (at WIS 147) and turns northwestward into Brown County, with a rest stop located just before the county line. I-43 in Manitowoc County has the least traveled portion of the highway with 17,400 vehicles passing south of WIS 147 according to 2005 results. These values increase further south.

The Interstate then continues another  to Bellevue where US 141 begins. This interchange provides access to WIS 29, a route the freeway crosses under later. At this point, the Interstate enters urban residential areas as it approaches Green Bay. I-43 junctions with WIS 172 in Allouez, then turns northeast to bypass Green Bay to the east, passing under the aforementioned WIS 29. After turning northwestward, the Interstate intersects WIS 54 and WIS 57 and crosses the Fox River on the Leo Frigo Memorial Bridge, passing through a heavily industrialized area near the Port of Green Bay. I-43 ends at I-41/US 41/US 141. I-43's lowest traffic volume in this county is at the southernmost entry with a 2006 value of 22,100 vehicles per day near Denmark. Values around Green Bay range from 34,600 to 42,200 vehicles per day.

History

Wisconsin had anticipated the Interstates with studies of possible toll roads. When the original Interstate System was approved, the state was only given two routes: I-90 and I-94. The Wisconsin Transportation Commission submitted a request to add an Interstate in 1953 connecting Milwaukee to Green Bay, a request the federal government denied. The commission, after a study by Wisconsin Turnpike Commission—which was established in 1953—submitted a request in 1963 for a route that connected Milwaukee and Superior by way of Green Bay, Wausau, Hurley, and Ashland which could be completed in increments. However, only the Milwaukee-to-Green Bay segment was approved. 

The original plan for the northern part of I-43 was to locate it midway between US 141 and US 41, using most of the current alignment of WIS 57 north of WIS 33 in Saukville; additionally, it was proposed to use the Interstate 57 number, though that was changed due to resistance from Illinois to extend its portion through Chicago. But farmers and landowners within the corridor opposed the plan. Protests, including farmers bringing their cows to graze on the Wisconsin State Capitol grounds, prompted a compromise to utilize the freeway built for US 141 between Milwaukee and Sheboygan instead, building the remaining freeway for the Interstate itself. This plan, particularly the new freeway, met resistance from the Brown, Sheboygan, and Manitowoc county governments. 

Construction first began in 1963 on the freeway that was, at the time, designated US 141. The first segment to begin construction was a  segment beginning at the Port Washington Road exit in Milwaukee County. An additional  of the highway were completed in Ozaukee County by 1964. In 1965, a  bypass of Sheboygan opened to traffic. The portion in Milwaukee County extending from the Port Washington Road exit to the Marquette Interchange was completed in 1981 to open the route. The route through Milwaukee was platted through the Black-American neighborhood of Bronzeville. Historically, segregation and related issues meant that this was the only place in Milwaukee where Black citizens could settle; it was later targeted for renewal to rid the city of what its political leadership saw as slums. The Interstate effectively finished off Bronzeville, as thousands of houses were seized via eminent domain and approximately a thousand businesses were razed.

The southwestern portion has also had a history of requests for Interstate routings. Interstate routings for such a connection between Beloit and the Milwaukee metropolitan area were requested by the Wisconsin Department of Transportation (WisDOT) but denied by the Federal Highway Administration (FHWA) in 1973. Another request for a link to Janesville was also denied. Despite the denials, local and state officials continued to seek funding to construct a freeway between these two metropolitan areas. A government collaboration called the "Highway 15 Committee" was formed to present and promote the route. Construction began on the route in the 1960s with the first segment, a  connector linking US 45 with I-894 as part of the project to build the Hale Interchange connecting the pending route with I-894. The new connector received the US 45 designation as that highway was transferred onto the freeway heading north. The first long segment was completed in 1969. It extended from the US 45 connector to CTH-F (now WIS 164) in Big Bend. After this segment was opened, the WIS 15 designation was applied. The next segment, to East Troy, was opened in 1972, the year the Highway 15 Committee had hoped the route would be completed in its entirety. It was extended to Elkhorn in 1973 in conjunction with the US 12 freeway construction, then to I-90 in 1976. I-43 signs were placed on the freeway by 1988 after designation in 1987, replacing WIS 15. I-43 was also mapped concurrently with I-94 and I-894 to link the two segments together. Even though exit number tabs were labeled according to the new mileposts, the mileposts themselves were not renumbered to coincide with the current length until 1991.

The Marquette Interchange, which connects I-43 with I-94, and I-794, was completely reconstructed over a four-year span, beginning in October 2004 and ending in September 2008. This project eliminated lefthand exits and widened connecting ramps between I-94 and I-43.

Major accidents
A multiple-vehicle collision on the northbound lanes of I-43 involving 52 vehicles, killing three and injuring at least 30 others, occurred on the Tower Drive Bridge at 6:45 am March 12, 1990. The cause was a wall of fog with extremely limited visibility near the Fox River on an otherwise clear day.

On October 10, 2002, a multiple-vehicle collision occurred on I-43, just south of Cedar Grove. The crash occurred on southbound I-43 in Sheboygan County just north of the Ozaukee–Sheboygan county line. It involved 50 vehicles and was found to have been caused by low visibility due to fog at a point where the freeway comes its closest to paralleling Lake Michigan,  from shore. The crash and resulting fires led to the deaths of 10 individuals, making this crash the deadliest in Wisconsin history. In addition to the fatalities, 36 people were also injured in the pileup. According to witnesses at the scene, fire from the wreckage rose over  into the air. First responders said many of the bodies they recovered were burned beyond recognition. Then-Sheboygan County Sheriff Loni Koenig said of the crash site, "In my 21 years [of law enforcement], this is the most horrific scene I have ever seen, and I'm sure that it is for many of the people there." The crash has since been described as the worst traffic crash in Wisconsin state history.

Another multiple-vehicle collision occurred on March 5, 2019, on the Leo Frigo Bridge because of ice on the bridge. Nobody was severely injured.

Future 
I-43 will expand from four to six lanes in total from Silver Spring Drive to WIS 60, with the anticipated completion in late 2024.

Exit list

Alternate route

I-43 has an alternate route within Manitowoc, Sheboygan, Ozaukee, and Milwaukee counties for situations requiring a road closure starting at WIS 83 at exit 43 in Mukwonago to Calumet Avenue (US 151) at exit 149 in Manitowoc, mainly using the former US 141 and WIS 15 locally known as Port Washington Road and designated as CTH-W in Milwaukee and Ozaukee counties, while as a series of roads in Waukesha County. Past WIS 33 in Saukville, the divided limited-access WIS 57 at the I-43/WIS 57 split is designated Alt. I-43 to WIS 23 in Plymouth, where it diverts off WIS 32 at Sheboygan, then north to WIS 42 at Howards Grove north to Manitowoc.

See also

References

External links

I-43 at Wisconsin Highways
I-43 at the Interstate Guide
I-43 at the Highways of the State of Wisconsin

43
43
Freeways in the Milwaukee area
Lake Michigan Circle Tour
Transportation in Rock County, Wisconsin
Transportation in Walworth County, Wisconsin
Transportation in Waukesha County, Wisconsin
Transportation in Milwaukee County, Wisconsin
Transportation in Ozaukee County, Wisconsin
Transportation in Sheboygan County, Wisconsin
Transportation in Manitowoc County, Wisconsin
Transportation in Brown County, Wisconsin